Lukáš Železník (born 18 June 1990) is a former professional Czech football player who played in the Czech First League for SFC Opava.

He has played at youth level for his country.

References

External links
 
 
 

1990 births
Living people
Czech footballers
Czech Republic youth international footballers
FC Fastav Zlín players
FC Hlučín players
SK Slavia Prague players
FK Mladá Boleslav players
SFC Opava players
Czech First League players
Czech National Football League players
Association football forwards